Marcus Perrin Knowlton (February 3, 1839 – May 7, 1918) was an American politician and jurist who served as chief justice of the Massachusetts Supreme Judicial Court.

Biography
Marcus Perrin Knowlton was born in Wilbraham, Massachusetts, to Merrick and Fatima Knowlton. He graduated from Yale University in 1860 and was admitted to the bar in 1862 in Hampden County, where he made his residence in Springfield. He was elected to the City Council, and also represented Springfield in the Massachusetts House of Representatives as well as the Massachusetts Senate.

In 1881, he was appointed to the Massachusetts Superior Court. His career there was successful enough to earn him a spot on the Massachusetts Supreme Court in 1887. Following the appointment of Oliver Wendell Holmes, Jr. to the United States Supreme Court in 1902, Knowlton took over as Chief Justice, and he held that position until he retired in 1911 due to failing eyesight.

He died at his home in Springfield on May 7, 1918.

See also
 1878 Massachusetts legislature

References

1839 births
1918 deaths
Chief Justices of the Massachusetts Supreme Judicial Court
People from Wilbraham, Massachusetts
19th-century American judges
Yale University alumni